Plant Genetic Systems (PGS), since 2002 part of Bayer CropScience, is a biotech company located in Ghent, Belgium. The focus of its activities is the genetic engineering of plants. The company is best known for its work in the development of insect-resistant transgenic plants.

Its origin goes back to the work of Marc Van Montagu and Jeff Schell at the University of Ghent who were among the first to assemble a practical system for genetic engineering of plants. They developed a vector system for transferring foreign genes into the plant genome, by using the Ti plasmid of Agrobacterium tumefaciens. They also found a way to make plant cells resistant to the antibiotic kanamycin by transferring a bacterial neomycin phosphotransferase gene into the plant genome. PGS was the first company (in 1985) to develop genetically engineered (tobacco) plants with insect tolerance by expressing genes encoding for insecticidal proteins from Bacillus thuringiensis (Bt).

History
The company was founded in 1982 by Marc Van Montagu and Jeff Schell who worked at the University of Ghent, Belgium. In 1996 the company was acquired by AgrEvo. In 2000, Aventis CropScience was formed through a merger of AgrEvo and Rhône-Poulenc Agro. In 2002, Bayer CropScience is formed through Bayer's acquisition of the plant biotech branch Aventis CropScience.

See also
 CropDesign
 Flanders Interuniversity Institute of Biotechnology (VIB)
 FlandersBio
 Marc Zabeau

References
 Hofte H, de Greve H, Seurinck J, Jansens S, Mahillon J, Ampe C, Vandekerckhove J, Vanderbruggen H, van Montagu M, Zabeau M, et al., Structural and functional analysis of a cloned delta endotoxin of Bacillus thuringiensis berliner 1715, Eur. J. Biochem. 1986 December 1;161(2):273-80.
 Leemans J, Ti to Tomato, Tomato to Market: A decade of plant biotechnology, Bio/Technology, vol. 11, March 1993.
 Vaeck, M., A. Reynaerts, H. Hofte, S. Jansens, M. De Beuckeleer, C. Dean, M. Zabeau, M. Van Montagu & J. Leemans. 1987, Transgenic plants protected from insect attack, Nature 328: 33-37.

External links
Institute of Plant Biotechnology for Developing Countries

Biological pest control
Genetic engineering and agriculture
Biotechnology companies of Belgium
Ghent
Biotechnology companies established in 1982
1982 establishments in Belgium
Companies based in East Flanders